Catmon, officially the Municipality of Catmon,  is a 4th class municipality in the province of Cebu, Philippines. According to the 2020 census, it has a population of 33,745 people.

The town fiesta is celebrated every February 10 in honor of their patron saint, St. William the Hermit. Part of the annual fiesta is the Budbod Kabog Festival and participated by the public schools.

Etymology
The municipality got its name from the presence of huge trees called katmon (Dillenia philippinensis) that thrive in this area. It was in 1835 that the town was founded under the Spaniards, but it was only in 1903 when the place became a municipality, after the Americans asked the leaders of Catmon and the nearby settlement of Sogod to merge into one, single municipality. 18 years after its establishment, in 1921, Sogod became a separate municipality.

Geography

Catmon is bordered on the north by the town of Sogod, to the west by the town of Tuburan, on the east by the Camotes Sea, and on the south by the town of Carmen.

Catmon's topography is generally mountainous and hilly but patches of flat lands can be found along the coastline and portion of the poblacion.
The municipality's climate is of Coronas climate type IV, where rainfall is evenly distributed throughout the year.
Mount Capayas (Kapayas) (also known as Tore Peak), Cebu's second highest peak, is located in Cambangkaya. Mount Capayas is one of the Key Biodiversity Areas (KBAs) of Cebu.

Barangays

Catmon comprises 20 barangays:

Climate

Demographics

Economy

References

External links

 [ Philippine Standard Geographic Code]

Municipalities of Cebu